Raymond or Ray Fisher may refer to:
 Raymond C. Fisher (1939–2020), U.S. judge
 Ray Fisher (baseball) (1887–1982), American baseball player
 Ray Fisher (actor) (born 1987), stage and film actor
 Ray Fisher (defensive lineman) (born 1934), American football player
 Ray Fisher (cornerback) (born 1987), American football player
 Ray Fisher (singer) (1940–2011), Scottish folk singer

See also
 Ray Fisher Stadium, a baseball stadium in Ann Arbor, Michigan